Christian Welzel (born 1964) is a German political scientist at the Leuphana University Lueneburg and director of research at the World Values Survey Association. He is known for the model of cultural dimensions which measures emancipative values and secular values.

University education and career
Welzel obtained his Magister Artium (M.A.) degree in political science and economic history at the Saarland University in 1991 and continued with a doctorate at the University of Potsdam. For his monograph Democratic Elite Change: The Renewal of East German Elites from the Perspective of Democratic Sociology he was awarded a PhD with distinction in 1996. He worked as a senior research fellow in the department of “Institutions and Social Change” of the Social Science Research Center Berlin and qualified as professor at the Free University of Berlin.

Following the publication of Vantage Point ‘Human Development’: On the Roots of Democracy and the Causes of its Diffusion  he became associate professor and started working as visiting professor at the University of Potsdam in 2000. In 2002, he moved to Bremen University as associate professor of political science.  In 2006 Welzel was promoted to full professor. Having spent eight years in Bremen, he took a new job as professor of political culture research at the Institute of Political Science and Center for the Study of Democracy at the Leuphana University in 2010. In the same year, he became research professor at the Higher School of Economics (HSE) in Saint Petersburg, Russia. Welzel also spends much time in the United States, where he maintains close ties with researchers and professors from the Center for the Study of Democracy at the University of California, Irvine.

In 2015 he became a member of the German Academy of Sciences Leopoldina.

Areas of academic interest
 Modernization, social change, and human development
 Democratization, quality of democracy and governance quality
 Value formation, cultural change, Generational Replacement and public opinion
 Protest participation and social movements
 Civil society and social capital

Value orientation, value change and World Values Survey

Since Welzel joined the Center for the Study of Democracy at the Leuphana University in Lueneburg, work on the World Values Survey project has been an important part of the center’s research activities.  Welzel is responsible for the German part of the survey, which involves 2000 face-to-face interviews. In recent years, Welzel has focused largely on the effect that emancipative values have on the emergence and stability of democratic regimes and developed a well-reasoned theory of emancipation. In his latest book Freedom Rising he presents an all-embracing theory of “why human freedom gave way to increasing oppression since the invention of states - and why this trend began to reverse itself more recently, leading to a rapid expansion of universal freedoms and democracy.”

Bibliography
Monographs
 .
 .
 .
 .

Edited Volumes
 .
 .
 .

Scientific articles

 .
 .
 .
 .
 .
 .
 .
 .
 .
 .
 .
 .
 .
 .
 .

References

External links
Christian Welzel's site at Leuphana University Lueneburg
World Values Survey Association
Christian Welzel's Freedom Rising at Cambridge University Press with extensive online resources for replication studies
Christian Welzel's Google Scholar profile

1964 births
Academic staff of the Leuphana University of Lüneburg
German political scientists
Academic staff of the Higher School of Economics
Winners of the Stein Rokkan Prize for Comparative Social Science Research
Living people
Members of the German Academy of Sciences Leopoldina